Joseph Malta (November 27, 1918 in Revere, Massachusetts; January 6, 1999) was the United States Army hangman who, with Master Sergeant John C. Woods, carried out the Nuremberg executions of ten former top leaders of the Third Reich on October 16, 1946, after they were sentenced to death during the Nuremberg Trials.  Malta was a 28-year-old military policeman when he volunteered for the job.  He ultimately hanged a total of 60 Nazi government and military leaders. A floor sander in civilian life, Malta left the Army in 1947 and returned to his former job. "It was a pleasure doing it," noted Malta in 1996, echoing the sentiments of his colleague Woods.

References 

 Nuremberg Hangman: No Regrets
 Joseph Kingsbury-Smith: The Execution of Nazi War Criminals

1918 births
1999 deaths
People from Revere, Massachusetts
Military personnel from Massachusetts
American executioners
Nuremberg trials
United States Army soldiers
American police officers
United States Army personnel of World War II